Brownhills railway station is a disused railway station that served the town of Brownhills and the village of Clayhanger in the Metropolitan Borough of Walsall, West Midlands. It was on the South Staffordshire Line between Walsall and Lichfield.

History

It was opened in 1849. The station was built and served by the South Staffordshire Railway, which later became the London, Midland and Scottish Railway (through amalgamation of the London and North Western Railway).

Unlike Wednesbury and Great Bridge further up the line, this station was never assigned another name when a second station was opened by the Midland Railway.

It closed as part of the Beeching Axe in January 1965. Goods trains continued to pass through the site until March 1984, when the line was completely closed. It is preserved in case the railway line between Walsall and Lichfield reopens.

Station site today
The trackbed is now a leisure greenway from Walsall to Brownhills. Traces of the former station can still be seen and some track remains down north of Brownhills near Anglesey Sidings.

References

Disused railway stations in Walsall
Railway stations in Great Britain opened in 1849
Railway stations in Great Britain closed in 1965
Beeching closures in England
1849 establishments in England
Former London and North Western Railway stations